Martinozzi is an Italian surname. Notable people with the surname include:

 Anne Marie Martinozzi (1637–1672), Italian noble
 Marie-Anne Martinozzi, Duchess of Bouillon, Italian-French aristocrat
 Laura Martinozzi (1639–1687), Italian noble, sister of Anne Marie

See also
 Martinuzzi (disambiguation)

Italian-language surnames
Patronymic surnames
Surnames from given names